Nuclear factor of activated T-cells, cytoplasmic 1 is a protein that in humans is encoded by the NFATC1 gene.

Function 

The product of this gene is a component of the nuclear factor of activated T cells DNA-binding transcription complex. This complex consists of at least two components: a preexisting cytosolic component that translocates to the nucleus upon T cell receptor (TCR) stimulation, and an inducible nuclear component. Proteins belonging to this family of transcription factors play a central role in inducible gene transcription during immune response. The product of this gene is an inducible nuclear component. It functions as a major molecular target for the immunosuppressive drugs such as ciclosporin. Five transcript variants encoding distinct isoforms have been identified for this gene. Different isoforms of this protein may regulate inducible expression of different cytokine genes.

Interactions 

NFATC1 has been shown to interact with PIM1.

See also 
 NFAT

References

Further reading

External links 
 

Transcription factors
Human proteins